Luca Fogale is a Canadian pop singer from Burnaby, British Columbia. He is most noted for his 2020 album Nothing Is Lost, which was a Juno Award nominee for Adult Contemporary Album of the Year at the Juno Awards of 2022.<ref>"2022 Juno nominees: snubs and surprises". CBC Music, March 1, 2022.</ref>

Fogale released his debut album Safety in 2016, and followed up with the singles "I Don't Want to Lose You" in 2017 and "What I Came Here For" in 2018 before releasing Nothing Is Lost'' in 2020.

He is a frequent collaborator with Mathew V, a fellow Juno nominee in 2022.

References

External links

Living people
21st-century Canadian male singers
Canadian pop singers
Musicians from British Columbia
People from Burnaby
Year of birth missing (living people)